The following is an alphabetical list of members of the United States House of Representatives from the state of Illinois.  For chronological tables of members of both houses of the United States Congress from the state (through the present day), see United States congressional delegations from Illinois.  The list of names should be complete as of January 3, 2019, but other data may be incomplete. Illinois became the 21st state on December 3, 1818.

Current representatives 
 : Jonathan Jackson (D) (since 2023)
 : Robin Kelly (D) (since 2013)
 : Delia Ramirez (D) (since 2023)
 : Jesús "Chuy" García (D) (since 2019)
 : Michael Quigley (D) (since 2009)
 : Sean Casten (D) (since 2019)
 : Danny K. Davis (D) (since 1997)
 : Raja Krishnamoorthi (D) (since 2017)
 : Jan Schakowsky (D) (since 1999)
 : Brad Schneider (D) (2013–2015, since 2017)
 : Bill Foster (D) (14th 2008–2011, since 2013)
 : Mike Bost (R) (since 2015)
 : Nikki Budzinski (D) (since 2023)
 : Lauren Underwood (D) (since 2019)
 : Mary Miller (R) (since 2021)
 : Darin LaHood (R) (since 2015)
 : Eric Sorensen (D) (since 2023)

List of members and delegates

See also

List of United States senators from Illinois
United States congressional delegations from Illinois
Illinois's congressional districts

References 
 House of Representatives List of Members

Illinois

United States representatives